Winburg Commando was a light infantry regiment of the South African Army. It formed part of the South African Army Infantry Formation as well as the South African Territorial Reserve.

History

Origin

With the Orange Free State Republic
In October 1899, President Marthinus Steyn of the Orange Free State ordered his commandants to muster all able bodied burgers in anticipation of war with the British. Marthinus Prinsloo was elected as commandant of Winburg.

On 9 October 1900 he occupied positions at Platberg Mountain near Harrismith. He was subsequently elected Chief Commandant of the Free State and then Helgard Theunissen was placed in command of the Winburg Commando. Note that Boer General Koos de la Rey was born in the district of Winburg on the farm Doornfontein. A subcommando of the Winburg Commando from Senekal began operating independently. Together these and other commandos invaded the Colony of Natal in the upper Tugela region.

(Transfer to the Western Front and the Battle of Paardeberg)
The Winburg Commando was withdrawn from the Natal Front on 14 February 1900 and rushed to the Kimberley area to assist General Piet Cronje.

500 Boers from Heidelberg and Winburg Commandos attacked a koppie held by the Yorkshire Regiment and East Kent Regiment. The Boer forces were using this area as an escape route. Kommandant Helgaard Theunissen with 87 Winburgers held their ground until the main Boer forces reached safety and after a few hours surrendered to the British. At least 15 Winburgers were killed in this operation.

In the Union Defence Force (UDF, 1912-1957)

By 1902 all Commando remnants were under British military control and disarmed. By 1912, however previous Commando members could join shooting associations. By 1940, such commandos were under control of the National Reserve of Volunteers. These commandos were formally reactivated by 1948.

In the South African Defence Force (SADF, 1957-1994)
The majority of the commandos operations in this era was local area protection.

In the South African National Defence Force (SANDF, 1994-)

Disbandment
This unit, along with all other Commando units was disbanded after a decision by South African President Thabo Mbeki to disband all Commando Units. The Commando system was phased out between 2003 and 2008 "because of the role it played in the apartheid era", according to the Minister of Safety and Security Charles Nqakula.

Unit Insignia

Leadership 

 Commandant Marthinus Prinsloo 1899
 Commandant Helgard Theunissen 1899

References

See also 
 South African Commando System

Infantry regiments of South Africa
South African Commando Units
Military units and formations of the Second Boer War